Actinoptera carignaniensis is a species of tephritid or fruit flies in the genus Actinoptera of the family Tephritidae.

Distribution
Nepal, India.

References

Tephritinae
Insects described in 1977
Diptera of Asia